Selo sanatoriya Glukhovskogo is a rural locality (a selo) in Maxim-Gorkovsky Selsoviet, Belebeyevsky District, Bashkortostan, Russia. The population was 657 as of 2010. There are 8  streets.

Geography 
It is located 25 km southeast of Belebey (the district's administrative centre) by road. Russkaya Shveytsariya is the nearest rural locality.

References 

Rural localities in Belebeyevsky District